Jenny Ohlsson (born 1975) is a Swedish diplomat who has been serving as State Secretary to the Minister for International Development Cooperation Matilda Ernkrans in the Ministry of Foreign Affairs (Sweden) since November 2021. She was the first Swedish ambassador to Rwanda.

Early life and education
Ohlsson attended the Pearson College UWC in Victoria, British Columbia between 1992 and 1994 and studied at Uppsala University from 1998 to 2007.

Career in diplomacy
Ohlsson joined the Swedish Ministry for Foreign Affairs in 2002. Her assignments included working for the Africa Department, the Swedish embassy in Pretoria and the Swedish office in Kigali (from 2007 to 2009). Another assignment was working as counsellor in the Ministry of Foreign Affairs and the Cabinet Office.

On a diplomatic level the diplomatic contacts of Sweden to Rwanda were upheld through the embassies in Nairobi and Kampala. The first Swedish representative in Rwanda in 1997 resided in a hotel room. The Swedish embassy in Kigali was opened in 2016. Jenny Ohlsson became the first Swedish ambassador to Rwanda residing in Kigali.

Altogether with Aegis Trust, Sweden has decided to fully fund the Rwanda Peace Education in 2013. Karongi Peace School was launched in 2017. and Ohlsson stated in her speech that she is honored to be here and that very little work in Rwanda had focused directly on reducing the behavioral risks of Genocide such as healing the divisionism, trauma and prejudices that were contributing factor to, and consequence of the 1994 Genocide. As a spokesperson for Sweden feminist forum policy she added that women empowerment is important topic that leads to more peaceful society.

In 2018, the Development Bank of Rwanda (BRD) has signed a $20 million guarantee agreement for lending to the renewable energy sector with the Swedish International Development Agency (SIDA). During the event, Ohlsson stated how important it is to collaborate, in order to find innovative solutions and to reach the global goals for sustainable development.

Ohlsson's time as ambassador in Kigali ended in 2019. She is succeeded by Johanna Teague.

Other activities
 Asian Development Bank (ADB), Ex-Officio Member of the Board of Governors (since 2022)
 Inter-American Development Bank (IDB), Ex-Officio Member of the Board of Governors (since 2022)

External links 
 Jenny Ohlsson on regeringen.se

Notes and references 

1970s births
Living people
Ambassadors of Sweden to Rwanda
Swedish women ambassadors
Uppsala University alumni
21st-century diplomats
Year of birth missing (living people)
People educated at a United World College